Tarski's theorem may refer to the following theorems of Alfred Tarski:
Tarski's theorem about choice
Tarski's undefinability theorem
Tarski's theorem on the completeness of the theory of real closed fields
 Knaster–Tarski theorem (sometimes referred to as Tarski's fixed point theorem)
 Tarski–Seidenberg theorem
 Some fixed point theorems, usually variants of the Kleene fixed-point theorem, are referred to the Tarski–Kantorovitch fixed–point principle or the Tarski–Kantorovitch theorem although the use of this terminology is limited.
The Tarski–Vaught test

See also

List of things named after Alfred Tarski